Lepidoperca is a small genus of fish belonging to the Anthiinae subfamily. It includes ten species.

Taxonomy
Lepidoperca was first established by the British ichthyologist Charles Tate Regan in 1914. It is classified under the subfamily Anthiinae of the family Serranidae.

Description
Members of Lepidoperca have moderately compressed oblong or ovate bodies. They have large eyes, with diameters longer than the distance between both eyes. The dorsal fin has ten spines and 15 to 17 soft rays. The margin has a slight notch just before it transitions into the soft-rayed portion. The anal fin has three spines and 7 to 9 soft rays. The pectoral fins have 15 to 17 soft rays, with all the rays branched except for the uppermost two. The caudal fin is truncate to lunate in shape with 15 soft rays. Both the upper and lower jaws have a pair of forward-facing canines. Vomerine teeth exist in a V-shaped patch. The tongue is smooth. The scales are large and ctenoid.

Lepidoperca is closely related to the genus Caesioperca, but differ from the latter in the smaller number of rays from the dorsal and anal fins, larger eyes, and their V-shaped vomerine teeth patch (in contrast to the pentagon-shaped patch of Caesioperca).

Species
The following species are classified under Lepidoperca:
 Lepidoperca aurantia Roberts, 1989 - New Zealand orange perch
 Lepidoperca brochata Katayama & Fujii, 1982 - Fangtooth perch
 Lepidoperca caesiopercula (Whitley, 1951) - Graycheek basslet
 Lepidoperca coatsii (Regan, 1913) 
 Lepidoperca filamenta Roberts, 1987 - Western orange perch
 Lepidoperca inornata Regan, 1914
 Lepidoperca magna Katayama & Fujii, 1982 - Sharphead perch
 Lepidoperca occidentalis Whitley, 1951 - Slender orange perch
 Lepidoperca pulchella (Waite, 1899) - Eastern orange perch
 Lepidoperca tasmanica Norman, 1937 - Tasmanian perch

References

External links

Anthiinae
Marine fish genera